Local mayoral by-elections were held in the Kosovo  municipalities of North Mitrovica and Podujevo on 29 November 2020. The election in Podujevo was originally scheduled for 15 March 2020 but was rescheduled due to the COVID-19 pandemic.

The by-elections in both municipalities were necessitated by the incumbent mayor resigning to join the Government of Kosovo. Podujevo mayor Agim Veliu resigned to become minister of the interior in Albin Kurti's first administration, while North Mitrovica mayor Goran Rakić resigned to become a deputy prime minister in Avdullah Hoti's government.

Results
As expected, the Serb List won the by-election in North Mitrovica without any difficulty. Vetëvendosje, which was then in opposition in the Assembly of the Republic of Kosovo, won a somewhat unexpected first-round victory in Podujevo.

North Mitrovica

Podujevo

Notes

References

Local elections in Kosovo
L
L